Cañeros del Este is a professional basketball team based in La Romana, La Romana Province, Dominican Republic. The team currently plays in the Dominican top division Liga Nacional de Baloncesto.

Championships
Liga Nacional de Baloncesto  (2x) 
2010, 2012

Notable players

  J'Covan Brown

References

Basketball teams established in 2005
2005 establishments in the Dominican Republic
Basketball teams in the Dominican Republic